October University for Modern Sciences and Arts  is a prominent private university located in Giza, Egypt. It was founded in 1996 by Dr. Nawal El-Degwi, a pioneer of the Egyptian private education. The university is accredited by the Egyptian and British ministry of education and a graduate student can study in Britain without any equivalence.

History 
MSA was established in 1996.

Faculties 

The university has nine faculties:
 Computer Science
 Pharmacy
 Mass Communication
 Management Sciences
 Engineering
 Biotechnology
 Arts and Design
 Oral and Dental Medicine
 Languages
Physiotherapy

British validation 
MSA was the pioneer in Egypt to validate its programs with British Universities in 2002.

It is the first Egyptian university to grant its graduates a dual-origin bachelor's degree; namely a British degree from Middlesex (2002-2014), Bedfordshire (2014-present) or Greenwich (2002–present) universities, and another Egyptian degree which is accredited by the Egyptian Supreme Council for Universities. Thus, MSA University graduates enjoy the privilege of attaining scholarships and have the chance to pursue their MA and PhD studies in the United Kingdom.

References

External links 
 Official Website

Universities in Egypt
Educational institutions established in 1996
1996 establishments in Egypt